Blue State may refer to:

Blue state, a state in the United States with a tendency toward electing Democrats
Blue States (band), an electronica band from London
Blue State (film), a 2007 romantic comedy film

See also
Blue State Coffee, coffee stores in Rhode Island, Connecticut, and Massachusetts
Blue State Digital, a Washington, D.C.-based Internet strategy and technology firm